Laurie Scott Baker (1943 - 16 November 2022) was a British composer and musician of Experimental and Electronic music. He was a pioneer of live electronics and graphic scores from the 1960s.

Life and career

He was born 1943 in Sydney, Australia. From 1958 he studied at the Julian Ashton Art School. His musical career began playing  double bass at the El Rocco jazz cellar, Sydney's major jazz venue at that time, with his school friend pianist Serge Ermoll.  He worked for the Sydney Morning Herald as a trainee graphic artist.

Baker left Australia in 1964, working his passage in the band on the Greek liner 'Patris'.

In London he worked on several collective projects with the composer Cornelius Cardew. He took part in Music Now, a concert society founded in 1968 by Victor Schonfield which introduced avant-garde music to British audiences, including the first UK performance of In C and also in the first performances of the composers Frederic Rzewski and John White. He took part in Christian Wolff's 'Burdocks' concert. He was a member of the Scratch Orchestra from its formation in 1969. Following on from this came the formation in 1972 of Peoples' Liberation Music with John Tilbury and John Marcangelo. Baker was a founder member in 1976 of Progressive Cultural Association and was also active in the Musicians Union.

There were also collaborations with Alan Gowen, Jamie Muir, and Allan Holdsworth in 'Sunship' and with Greg Bright in 'Maze'.

Baker played in various West End theatre productions including Hair (1968). There was also recording session work, including with Manfred Mann, Bob Downes, Ray Russell, Alex Harvey and others. He also composed music for film and television with two songs for the feature film, Secrets (1971) performed by Maggie Bell and another by the Cymarons, an early reggae band.

In 1976 he was commissioned by Unity Records to compose and produce a record celebrating the anniversary of the 1926 British General Strike using traditional working class music forms such as brass bands, industrial ballads, and contemporary rock; John Marcangelo was the composer on the 2nd side. Its final production was blocked by the Arts Council.

In 1977/8 he composed and produced the music for two animations by Geoff Dunbar, 'Lautrec' (1974) and the cult movie 'UBU' (1978). He also worked with Richard Keith Wolff on the short film "Still Life" (1980).

At the beginning of the 1980s he worked doing film dubbing mixing for the BBC while continuing to compose music for Television and Radio. In the 1990s he mainly worked on commissions for BBC Radio Drama including several series.

He left the BBC in 1995 and returned to full time music as Artistic Director of the Musicnow record label which was set up in 1991.

A short animation 'Echidna' was produced for S4C in Wales and shown at several festivals including the Short Film Festival Flickerfest (2004) in Sydney and also on ABC.

The double album 'Gracility', released in 2009, contains archive recordings from 1969 to 1975 of music composed by Baker. The title track (1969) features Derek Bailey, Keith Rowe, Gavin Bryars, and Evan Parker. 'Bass Chants & Cues' (1972) features John Tilbury and Jamie Muir. The track 'Circle Piece', recorded in 1970, was performed by the Scratch Orchestra: Alec Hill, Hugh Shrapnel, Andy Mackay, Chris May, Phil Gebett, Ed Fulton, Bryn Harris, Christopher Hobbs, John White, and Michael Parsons. Evan Parker performs 'Pibroch 1926'. 

In 2013 an exhibition of his graphic scores from the 1960s was held at SNO (Sydney Non Objective Contemporary Art Projects).

Following a stroke he died 16 November 2022 in Brentford and is buried in GreenAcres Chiltern woodland burial park.

Discography

References

1943 births
2022 deaths
20th-century classical composers
English classical composers
Experimental composers
English experimental musicians
Musicians from Sydney
Julian Ashton Art School alumni